Amana Bank may refer to:

 Amana Bank (Sri Lanka), a commercial bank in Sri Lanka
 Amana Bank (Tanzania), a commercial bank in Tanzania